Andreas Freytag (born 23 October 1962) is a German economist. He currently holds the chair for political economics at the University of Jena.

Freytag earned his Diplom in economics from the University of Kiel in 1990, where he studied under Herbert Giersch. In 1994, he completed his doctoral degree in economics under supervision of Juergen B. Donges at the University of Cologne.

External links
 Official bio at the University of Jena

1962 births
Living people
University of Kiel alumni
University of Cologne alumni
Academic staff of the University of Jena
20th-century German economists